This is a list of compositions by Carlos Chávez (1899–1978), in chronological order.

Reference

External links 
 Carlos Chávez: Biography & list of works (in English, French & Spanish)
 Carlos Chávez manuscripts in the Music Division of The New York Public Library for the Performing Arts

Chávez, Carlos